Rushey Green  may refer to:

Rushey Green (ward)
Rushey Green, part of the A205 road
Rush Common